ABTA may refer to:

 All Bengal Teachers Association, a teacher's movement in the Indian state of West Bengal
 American Brain Tumor Association, a not-for-profit organization
 Association of British Travel Agents, the UK travel trade association for tour operators and travel agents